Clearstream is a financial services company that specializes in the settlement of securities transactions and is owned by Deutsche Börse AG. It provides settlement and custody as well as other related services for securities across all asset classes. It is one of two European International central securities depositories (Euroclear being the other).

Clearstream operates securities settlement systems  based in both Luxembourg and Germany, which allow for the holding and transfer of securities.

Clearstream operates its International Central Securities Depository (ICSD) from Luxembourg. It is also a joint partner in the Luxembourgish Central Securities Depository (CSD), LuxCSD, together with the Central Bank of Luxembourg. In Germany, Clearstream operates the German CSD, Clearstream Banking AG. Clearstream has links to over 50 domestic markets worldwide, and also issues and safekeeps Eurobonds.

In 2014, the value of assets under custody on behalf of customers averaged 12.2 trillion euros; furthermore, Clearstream processed 43.65 million ICSD and 82.68 million CSD settlement transactions.

Clearstream has around 2,500 customers in 110 countries. Clearstream accepts central banks and AML-regulated credit institutions (such as regulated banks) as customers. Clearstream does not accept natural persons as customers and no account is opened in the name of a natural person. Clearstream has therefore been described as a "bank for banks".

Clearstream has operational centres in Cork, Luxembourg, Prague and Singapore. It also maintains representative offices in London, Hong Kong, Tokyo, Dubai, New York, and Zurich.

History
Clearstream was founded as "Cedel" (Centrale de Livraison de Valeurs Mobilières) in September 1970 by 66 of the world's major financial institutions as a clearing organisation whose objective was to minimise risk in the settlement of cross-border securities trading, particularly in the growing Eurobond market.

In 1995, a new corporate structure was introduced, establishing a parent company — Cedel International — with a subsidiary company, Cedelbank; two years later, a new subsidiary — Cedel Global Services — was established.

Clearstream was formed in January 2000 through the merger of Cedel International and Deutsche Börse Clearing. The full integration of Clearstream was completed in July 2002.

Clearstream affair

Between 2001 and 2002, two books were published by co-authors Denis Robert and Ernest Backes, entitled Révélation$ and La Boîte Noire, accusing Clearstream of being a money laundering organisation and the worldwide centre for international financial crime committed by major banks, shell companies, and organised crime all over the world.
An investigation opened by the Luxembourg authorities in 2001 found no evidence to support the authors' allegations, and the case was dismissed in 2004.

In 2004, a list leaked to a French judge indicated that Clearstream was a money laundering organisation covering illegal activities of French businessmen who were involved in the sale of warships by the French defence giant Thales (known as Thomson-CSF before 2000) to Taiwan, and related bribes paid to French officials and businessmen.
An investigation that included the search of Clearstream's premises and an examination of accounts in 2004 found no evidence supporting the accusations.

In the same year, additional anonymous letters and CD-Roms sent to French judges accused Clearstream of running secret accounts for criminals and senior French politicians. In late 2005, French investigating authorities officially declared the documents forgeries and dismissed the case.

The controversy inspired the film The Clearstream Affair (2014).

Iranian funds controversy
In 2008, several groups of plaintiffs commenced enforcement proceedings in the US to satisfy judgments which they had obtained against Iran by restraining certain positions held in a Clearstream securities account with its intermediary bank in the US, and asking for handover of the assets. Clearstream challenged the restraints and the handover.

In 2011, the plaintiffs filed additional claims, this time directly against Clearstream, for damages of USD 250 million in connection with the purported wrongful conveyance of some of the restrained positions. Clearstream entered into a settlement agreement with the plaintiffs that became effective in 2013. The settlement provided for the dismissal of the direct claims against Clearstream, and that the plaintiffs will not further sue Clearstream for damages and in return, Clearstream agreed to not further appeal an order directing the turnover of the restrained customer's assets to the plaintiffs. 
  
In 2013, a number of US plaintiffs from the 2011 case, as well as other US plaintiffs, filed a complaint targeting certain blocked assets that Clearstream holds as a custodian in Luxembourg. In 2015, the US court issued a decision dismissing the lawsuit.

Arising from the above, the U.S. Treasury Department Office of Foreign Assets Control (OFAC) investigated certain securities' transfers in 2008 within Clearstream's settlement systems regarding US Iran sanctions regulations. These 2008 transfers had been undertaken as part of the decision taken by Clearstream in 2007 to close its Iranian customers' accounts. In 2013 Clearstream entered into settlement talks with OFAC. The matter was resolved in 2014 through a settlement and payment of USD 151.9 million that does not constitute a final determination that a violation of Iran sanctions had occurred.

2022: Aftermath of Russian invasion of Ukraine

The Russian depository blocked all securities held in Clearstream's account at the Russian depository, on March 1, 2022. The Russian depository also froze payments on securities of Russian issuers from being made to non-Russian individuals and entities.

After the 2022 Russian invasion of Ukraine, the Russian National Settlement Depository said on March 25, 2022, that Clearstream had blocked its account.

Also, the ruble bridge between Clearstream and Euroclear was closed. Furthermore, Clearstream stopped settling trades in Russian securities.

Joint ventures
In July 2010, Clearstream founded LuxCSD together with the Luxembourg Central Bank, to act as a CSD for Luxembourg.

In December 2010, Clearstream co-founded REGIS-TR, a joint venture with the Spanish Central Securities Depository Iberclear, to act as a trade repository for derivatives transactions, helping participants meet their regulatory reporting obligations brought about by the introduction of the European Market Infrastructure Regulation (EMIR).

Supervision
Based in Luxembourg and Germany, Clearstream is subject to the supervision of the regulatory authorities of these two countries. In Luxembourg, the Commission de Surveillance du Secteur Financier (CSSF) is the prudential regulator with authority over all banks and financial service providers. In Germany, Clearstream is regulated as a bank according to the German Banking Act ("Kreditwesengesetz") and is therefore subject to the prudential supervision of the German Federal Financial Supervisory Authority (German: "Bundesanstalt für Finanzdienstleistungsaufsicht" - BaFin). Moreover, Clearstream is regulated in each market where it has operational centres, for example by the Monetary Authority of Singapore.

As the operator of securities settlement systems in both Luxembourg and Germany, Clearstream is additionally regulated by the central banks of these two countries, namely the Banque centrale du Luxembourg and the Deutsche Bundesbank.

Business streams

Asset Services
Clearstream is responsible for the management, safekeeping/custody and administration of securities (assets) under custody. Services include income and redemption payments, corporate actions as well as tax and proxy voting.

The majority of securities safekept by Clearstream are immobilised. Securities are reflected in book-entry form in the accounts of customers at Clearstream regardless of whether they are held in physical or dematerialised form. This means that they are no longer represented by physical certificates, but instead by data entered into the Clearstream systems.

Global Securities Financing
Securities financing is the ability to borrow or lend cash or securities against collateral. In securities financing, collateral comprises assets given as a guarantee by a borrower to secure a securities loan and subject to seizure in the event of default. Collateral management refers to the handling of all tasks related to the monitoring of collateral posted by a borrower to meet a financial obligation (optimisation, substitution, top-up, withdrawal, settlement instruction, reporting, processing of margin calls and returns, notification of corporate events, etc.).

Clearstream's collateral management, securities lending and borrowing services are gathered under the Global Liquidity Hub. It provides a pool of liquidity through links to agent banks, trading platforms, clearing houses and other market infrastructures.

Clearstream is a member of the Liquidity Alliance, which was established in January 2013 as a platform for CSDs to collaborate on collateral management. It was founded by ASX, Cetip, Clearstream, Iberclear and Strate.

Investment Fund Services
Clearstream has developed the world's largest cross-border fund processing platform, called Vestima. It handles all types of funds, from mutual funds to exchange-traded funds (ETFs) and hedge funds.

In addition to providing access to all fund types, Vestima supports their cross-border distribution. Services offered by Vestima include order routing, centralised delivery versus payment (DVP) settlement, safekeeping, asset servicing and collateral management.

Issuance
ICSDs and CSDs are often used to bring a security issue to the market, as they possess the necessary infrastructure for distributing the securities to the investors as well as for settlement and safekeeping. Clearstream's ICSD also provides custody services, which means that the security can be serviced throughout its entire lifecycle. Clearstream provides the infrastructure which enables issuers to reach investors worldwide.

Clearstream's services include eligibility assessments, issuance and distribution of domestic, foreign and international (i.e. Eurobonds) new issues of global and domestic instruments: certificates of deposit, depository receipts, treasury bills, commercial papers, short-term and medium-term notes, bonds, equities, warrants, equity-linked notes and investment fund shares.

Settlement
Clearstream's ICSD settles trades in international securities and in domestic securities traded across borders. The CSDs settle domestic transactions in the German and Luxembourgish markets. Transactions between the two ICSDs Clearstream and Euroclear are settled via an electronic communications platform, called the Bridge.

Clearstream operates a delivery versus payment settlement system, ensuring simultaneous settlement of securities and cash transfers on a gross (trade-by-trade) basis. This helps to minimise the risk associated with the settlement of securities.

Notable people
 

Jeffrey Tessler

Bibliography
Peter Norman: Plumbers and Visionaries: Securities Settlement and Europe's Financial Market. (Wiley, 2008)
Denis Robert, Ernest Backes: Révélation$ (Edition des Arènes, 2001)
Denis Robert, Ernest Backes: La Boîte Noire (Edition des Arènes, 2002)

References

External links
Clearstream's website

Capital markets of Europe
Contemporary French history
Payment systems
Companies established in 2000
Central securities depositories
Securities clearing and depository institutions
2000 in Luxembourg

ar:قضية كليرستريم